ZGC may refer to:

Transportation

 ZGC, a type of dual-voltage electric multiple unit trainset (Z 27500)

Other uses

 Lanzhou Zhongchuan International Airport, China, by IATA airport code